The Gainesville-Lake City, FL Combined Statistical Area consists of the Gainesville, FL Metropolitan Statistical Area and the Lake City, FL Micropolitan Statistical Area. It was defined in 2012.

The CSA had a population of 331,806 in the census of 2010, and an estimated population of 354,299 in 2017.

References

Combined statistical areas of the United States
Gainesville metropolitan area, Florida
Columbia County, Florida